Molla Hajji may refer to:
 Molla Hajji, East Azerbaijan
 Molla Hajji, Kerman